Mark Anthony Davis (born November 25, 1964) is a retired professional baseball player who played one season for the California Angels of Major League Baseball.

References
, or Retrosheet
Pura Pelota (Venezuelan Winter League)

1964 births
Living people
African-American baseball players
American expatriate baseball players in Canada
American expatriate baseball players in Mexico
Appleton Foxes players
Baseball players from San Diego
Birmingham Barons players
California Angels players
Edmonton Trappers players
Major League Baseball outfielders
Midland Angels players
New Orleans Zephyrs players
Olmecas de Tabasco players
Peninsula White Sox players
Petroleros de Minatitlán players
Rojos del Águila de Veracruz players
Stanford Cardinal baseball players
Stanford University alumni
Tiburones de La Guaira players
American expatriate baseball players in Venezuela
Vancouver Canadians players
21st-century African-American people
20th-century African-American sportspeople
Alaska Goldpanners of Fairbanks players